The Goodreads Choice Awards is a yearly award program, first launched on Goodreads in 2009.

Winners are determined by users voting on books that Goodreads has nominated or books of their choosing, released in the given year. Most books that Goodreads nominates are from verified Goodreads authors.  The final voting round collects the top 10 books from 20 different categories.

Winners

Ongoing awards

2000s

2010s

2020s

Discontinued awards

Multiple wins 
Several authors have won multiple Goodreads Readers Choice Awards or the same award in multiple years. Stephen King and both his sons, Owen and Joe, have won The Goodreads Choice Awards. The table below sets out those authors to have won more than one award:

(Listed by number of wins, then alphabetically by surname)

References 

International literary awards
Awards established in 2009
English-language literary awards